Nikola Đorđević may refer to:

Nikola Đorđević (footballer, born 1993), Serbian association football forward
Nikola Đorđević (footballer, born 1994), Serbian association football forward who plays for FK Sloga Petrovac na Mlavi